Siege of Malta may refer to:

 Siege of Malta (1429), a siege by the Moors
 Siege of Malta (1565), a siege by the Ottoman Empire against the Knights Hospitaller
 The Siege of Malta (novel), an 1832 novel by Sir Walter Scott
 Siege of Malta, a 1570 heroic poem about the siege by Antonios Achelis
 Siege of Malta (1798–1800), a siege by the British and Maltese against the French
 Siege of Malta (World War II), a siege by the Axis powers

See also 
 Battle of Malta (disambiguation)